The following is a list of awards and nominations received by English actor Idris Elba.

Major associations

BAFTA Awards

Emmy Awards

Golden Globe Awards

Screen Actors Guild Awards

Miscellaneous awards

References

Elba, Idris